Shripad may refer to:

Shripad Dabholkar (1924–2001), intellectual and activist from India
Shripad Mahadev Mate (1886–1957), (or Shri Maa MaaTe), a Marathi writer
Shripad Narayan Pendse (1913–2007), major Indian novelist of the post-Independence period
Shripad Shri Vallabha the first avatara (incarnation) of the deity Shri Dattatreya in Kali Yuga
Shripad Yasso Naik (born 1952), member of the 14th Lok Sabha of India
Shripad Supekar (born 1988)